Axim Girls Senior High School is an all female second cycle institution in Axim in the Western Region of Ghana.

History 
The school was established in 2009 by local Axim leaders and absorbed into the Ghana Education System in 2012.

References

Girls' schools in Ghana
High schools in Ghana
Education in the Western Region (Ghana)
Educational institutions established in 2009
2009 establishments in Ghana